Paurocotylis is a genus of fungi in the family Pyronemataceae. The genus is monotypic, containing the single species Paurocotylis pila, a truffle-like fungus found in Europe and New Zealand. It was described by Miles Joseph Berkeley in Joseph Dalton Hooker's 1855 publication The Botany of the Antarctic Voyage II, Flora Novae-Zealandiae.

References

Pyronemataceae
Taxa described in 1855
Fungi of Europe
Fungi of New Zealand
Monotypic Ascomycota genera
Truffles (fungi)
Taxa named by Miles Joseph Berkeley